The 1996 Kärcher World Junior Curling Championships were held in Red Deer, Alberta March 9–17.

Men's

Tiebreakers
 8-3 
 8-7

Playoffs

Women's

Tiebreaker
 8-3

Playoffs

Sources

J
World Junior Curling Championships
World Junior Curling Championships
Curling competitions in Alberta
Sports competitions in Red Deer, Alberta
International curling competitions hosted by Canada
World Junior Curling Championships
World Junior Curling Championships